FK Napredak is a Montenegrin football club based in the town of Berane. They currently compete in the Montenegrin Third League - North Region.

References

Napredak